Kuppali Puttappa Poornachandra Tejaswi (8 September 1938 – 5 April 2007) was a prominent Indian writer and  novelist in Kannada. He also worked as  a photographer, publisher, painter, naturalist, and environmentalist. He made a great impression in the Navya ("new") period of Kannada literature and inaugurated the Bandaaya Saahitya genre of protest literature with his short-story collection Abachoorina Post Offisu. He is the son of noted Kannada poet Kuvempu.

At early stages of his writing career, Tejaswi wrote poems but later concentrated on short stories, novels and essays. His distinctive style of writing is credited with heralding a new era in Kannada literature.

Early life
Tejaswi was born on 8 September 1938 in Kuppali in Shimoga district of Karnataka. Although he was the son of Kuvempu, he came out of his father's shadow and established his own image at an early age. Tejaswi received best story award in the competition held by Prajavani Kannada newspaper on the occasion of Deepavali, for his first short story "Linga Banda", a look at the rainy Western Ghats from the eye of a boy. After completion of his education from Maharaja College of Mysore, one among the top colleges in India, due to his interests in nature and farming, he moved to Mudigere taluk of Chikmagalur District after buying a coffee estate. Apart from literature he was actively involved in painting, photography and philosophy.

He was a keen learner of nature and his favourite pastime was to roam around in the forests of western ghats.

Literary works
Tejaswi has written in almost all forms of literature including poems, short stories, novels, travel literature, plays and science fiction. Nature and incidents related to nature enjoy major roles in most of his works. One of the most popular writers in Kannada, Tejaswi's works have continued to remain popular, going into multiple prints and often topping reader's charts. Karvalo is one such novel where the author participates in an adventure of discovering a flying lizard in the dense forests of Western Ghats.

Tejaswi has translated a number of English books to Kannada enriching the depth of Kannada literature. His famous translations include the series on Kenneth Anderson's hunting expeditions and Henri Charrière's Papillon.

Tejaswi wrote his first novel, Kaadu Mattu Kraurya, when he was a 24-year-old in 1962. The novel is expected to be in print for the first time towards the end of 2012. He had initially planned to name this work Nalini but later decided to go by its present title. Tejaswi was inspired to write the novel after visiting his wife Rajeshwari's maternal home in the forested Malnad region of Karnataka. The novel, whose manuscript was prepared by Rajeshwari, is the story of Linga, a migrant bonded labourer from north Karnataka who moves to a remote Malnad village where he struggles to cope with his new life and surroundings.

Awards
 Sahitya Academy Award for "Chidambara Rahasya" (1987)
 Karnataka Sahitya Academy  (1985)
 Pampa Award (2001) Honorary Award for Lifetime Achievement
 Rajyotsava Award
 Karnataka Sahitya Akademi Award for "Karvalo"
 Karnataka Sahitya Akademi Award for "Chidambara Rahasya"
 Karnataka Sahitya Akademi Award for "Kiragoorina Gayyaligalu"
 Karnataka Sahitya Akademi Award for "Alemariya Andaman Mattu Mahanadi Nile"
 Karnataka Sahitya Akademi Award for "Parisarada Kathe
 Karnataka Sahitya Akademi Award for "Kaadina Kathegalu"
 Karnataka Sahitya Akademi Award for "Vismaya" along with Pradeep Kenjige
 Karnataka State Film Award for Best Story 1986-87 for "Tabarana Kathe"
 Karnataka State Film Award for Best Dialogue 1986-87 for "Tabarana Kathe"
 Karnataka State Film Award for Best Story  1989-90 for "Kubi mattu Iyala"

Bibliography

Novellas
 Swaroopa
 Nigoodha Manushyaru

Novels
 Karvalo (1980)
 Chidambara Rahasya (1985)
 Jugari Cross (1992)
 Mayaloka - 1 (2006)
 Kaadu Mattu Kraurya (2013)

Short stories
 Huliyoorina Sarahaddu
 Abachurina Post Office (1973)
 Kiragoorina Gayyaligalu (1990)
 Pakakaranthi Mattu Itara Kathegalu (2008)
 Parisarada kathe (1991)
 Aeroplane Chitte Mattu Itara Kathegalu (1993)
 Aayda Kathegalu (2007)

Travelogue
 Alemariya Andaman Mattu Mahanadi Nile

Poetry
 Somuvina Swagata Lahari (1964)

Drama
 Yamala Prashne (1965)

Criticism
 Vyaktivishishta Siddantha (1967)
 Vimarsheya Vimarshe (2011)
 Hosa Vicharagalu (2015)

Adventure
 Bellandoorina Narabhakshaka (Kadina Kategalu Volume 1)
 Peddacheruvina Rakshasa (Kadina Kategalu Volume 2)
 Jaalahalliya Kurka (Kadina Kategalu Volume 3)
 Munishami Mathu Magadi Chirathe (Kadina Kategalu Volume 4)
 Rudraprayagada Bhayanaka Narabhakshaka

Science
 Sahaja Krushi
 Missing Link
 Flying Saucers (Part 1& 2)
 Vismaya (1, 2 & 3)

About birds & nature
 Minchulli [ Kannada Naadina Hakkigalu - 1]
 Hejje Moodada Haadi [ Kannada Naadina Hakkigalu - 2 ]
 Hakki Pukka
 Mayeya Mukhagalu (Photo Album)

Millennium (series 1-16)
 Hudukata
 Jeevana Sangrama
 Pacific Dweepagalu
 Chandrana Chooru
 Nerehoreya Geleyaru
 Mahayudda - 1
 Mahayudda - 2
 Mahayudda - 3
 Desha Videsha - 1
 Desha Videsha - 2
 Desha Videsha - 3
 Desha Videsha - 4
 Vismaya Vishwa  - 1
 Mahapalayana - Translation of The Long Walk by Sławomir Rawicz
 Vismaya Vishwa - 2
 Adventure

Translation (Autobiography of Henri Charrière)
 Papillon - 1
 Papillon - 2
 Baji Papiyon - 3

(Translated with Pradeep Kenjige)

Biography
 Annana Nenapu

Annana Nenapu is a biography of the Tejaswi which discusses his days with his father, the national poet of India Rashtrakavi Kuvempu, revealing the actual lifestyle of the Kuvempu and his bonding with his family.

About Tejaswi
 Nanna Tejaswi by Rajeshwari Tejaswi
 Poornachandra Tejaswi Baduku Baraha by Karigowda Beechanahalli
 Poornachandra Tejaswi Avara Sahitya Vachike by Karigowda Beechanahalli
 K. P. Poornachandra Tejaswi by Maheshwaraiah
 Kaadina Santa Tejaswi by Dhananjaya Jeevala

Works in visual media

Movies
 Abachurina Post Office
 Tabarana Kathe Kubi Mattu Iyala
 Kiragoorina Gayyaligalu Daredevil Musthafa

TV Serial
 Chidambara Rahasya

Plays
 Jugari Cross
 Chidambara Rahasya Krishnegowdana Aane
 Yamala Prashne Maayamruga
 Parisarada Kathe Karvalo
 Kiragoorina Gayyaligalu

Trivia
 Tejaswi heralded a new wave, when he (with like-minded friends) compiled Kuvempu's Sri Ramayana Darshanam in Kuvempu's handwriting. The Government of Karnataka aided the effort with grants, but the cost of the book was high and ended up with mediocre success.
 A controversy started in early 2004 demanding inducting Madhwacharya's name in Jaya Bharata Jananiya Tanujate, written by Kuvempu. Tejaswi, as son of Kuvempu and holder of copyrights of Kuvempu's articles, strongly criticised any attempts to change the poem.
 While some intellectuals condemned the daubing incident of Belgaum Mayor Vijay More's face with black paint on 11 November 2005, Tejaswi rhetorically asked if More deserved Fair & Lovely instead.
 Tejaswi had a great appetite and was known for his fondness for good food.

Death
He died of cardiac arrest at his farm house Niruttara, Mudigere in Chikmagalur district of Karnataka state, on 5 April 2007 approximately at 2.00 p.m. He was 69 at the time. He has 2 daughters Susmitha and Eshanye who are software professionals. His wife Rajeshwari stayed in Niruttara, Mudigere.

Further reading
 Poornachandra Tejaswi's "Annana Nenapu", although not an autobiography, extensively narrates his childhood and early life.
 "Nanna Tejaswi" is a memoir written by Poornachandra Tejaswi's wife, Rajeshwari, that documents the years they spent together.
 "Kaadina Santa Tejaswi" by Dhananjay Jeevala.
 Tejaswi Badukiddare by Keerthi Kolgar

See also
Kannada
Kannada literature

References

External links

TEJASWI VISMAYA – To Realize Poornachandra Tejaswi's Life – Literature – Thoughts

Pampa Award to Tejaswi in 2001

1938 births
2007 deaths
Indian atheists
Indian socialists
Kannada-language writers
Bandaya writers
People from Shimoga district
Kannada people
Recipients of the Sahitya Akademi Award in Kannada
Maharaja's College, Mysore alumni
20th-century Indian novelists
Film musicians from Karnataka
Indian male novelists
20th-century Indian photographers
Photographers from Karnataka
20th-century Indian dramatists and playwrights
20th-century Indian short story writers
20th-century Indian poets
Novelists from Karnataka
20th-century Indian male writers